In the island of Saint Helena and the archipelago of Tristan da Cunha, telecommunications are administered by Sure Saint Helena. There is a fixed five-digit number plan, and the country calling code is +290.

Ascension Island is also part of the British Overseas Territory of Saint Helena, Ascension and Tristan da Cunha, but it has a separate calling code and numbering scheme.

2013 change to numbering plan
From 1 October 2013, all existing 4-digit telephone numbers on St Helena were to be prefixed by a '2' to move from a 4-digit to a 5-digit numbering plan. The change in numbering resulted after the increased demand for new telephone services while also providing a platform for the future introduction of a cellular network on the island.

Allocations

Tristan da Cunha

Although Tristan da Cunha shares the +290 code with St Helena, residents have access to the Foreign and Commonwealth Office Telecommunications Network, provided by Global Crossing. This uses a London 020 numbering range, meaning that numbers are accessed via the UK telephone numbering plan.

See also
Telephone numbers in the United Kingdom
Telephone numbers in Ascension Island

References

Saint Helena
Saint Helena-related lists